Conidiobolus incongruus is a species of Conidiobolus.

It is associated with conidiobolomycosis.

References

Entomophthorales